Michael Plooy (born 16 June 1984) is a professional Dutch darts player who plays in Professional Darts Corporation events.

He tried to earn a PDC Tour Card in 2017, but didn't earn enough points to qualify. He did qualify for three PDC European Tour events, although he didn't win a game in any of them.

References

External links
Profile and stats on Darts Database

1984 births
Living people
Dutch darts players